Peter Paul Nikolas Orlik (born 12 November 1938, in Budapest) is an American mathematician, known for his research on topology, algebra, and combinatorics.

Orlik earned in 1961 his bachelor's degree from the Norwegian Institute of Technology in Trondheim and in 1966 his Ph.D. from the University of Michigan under Frank Raymond with thesis Necessary conditions for the homeomorphism of Seifert manifolds. He became in 1966 an assistant professor and in 1973 a full professor at the University of Wisconsin–Madison.

Orlik was in the academic year 1971/72 a visiting professor in Oslo. From 1967 to 1969 he was a visiting scholar at the Institute for Advanced Study.

Orlik is the author of over 70 publications. He works on Seifert manifolds, singularity theory, braid theory, reflection groups, invariant theory, and hypergeometric integrals. He was, with Louis Solomon and Hiroaki Terao, a pioneer of the theory of arrangements of hyperplanes in complex space.

In 2012 he was elected a Fellow of the American Mathematical Society.

Selected publications

Books
Seifert Manifolds, Lecture Notes in Mathematics 291, Springer Verlag, 1972
as editor: Singularities, 2 vols., American Mathematical Society, 1983
Introduction to Arrangements, CBMS Regional Conference Series, American Mathematical Society, 1989
 
 
with Volkmar Welker: Algebraic Combinatorics. Lectures at a Summer School in Nordfjordeid, Norway, June 2003, Universitext, Springer Verlag, 2007

Articles
with Colin P. Rourke: 
with John Milnor: 
with Frank Raymond: 
with Philip Wagreich: 
The multiplicity of a holomorphic map at an isolated critical point, in Real and complex singularities, Oslo: Sijthoff and Noordhoff, 1977, 405–474

with Louis Solomon: 
with Daniel C. Cohen:

References

20th-century American mathematicians
21st-century American mathematicians
Topologists
Norwegian Institute of Technology alumni
University of Michigan alumni
University of Wisconsin–Madison faculty
Fellows of the American Mathematical Society
Institute for Advanced Study visiting scholars
1938 births
Living people
Hungarian emigrants to the United States
Mathematicians from Budapest